Piz Triazza (3,043 m) is a mountain in the Sesvenna Range of the Alps, located south-east of Scuol in the canton of Graubünden. It lies on the range east of the Val Triazza.

References

External links
 Piz Triazza on Hikr

Mountains of the Alps
Mountains of Graubünden
Mountains of Switzerland
Scuol